Sirigu Women's Organisation for Pottery and Arts (SWOPA) is an organisation which was established  by Melanie Kasise in the year 1997 to assist women of Sirigu. The organisation started with 54 women and has expanded to 345 active women. These active women ply their work in basketry, weaving, pottery and other crafts to the Sirigu area in the upper east region of Ghana. It is also a self-funded organisation.

Sirigu Women's Organisation for Pottery and Arts (SWOPA) was honoured with a communications award from the International Cooperation and Development Directorate-General of European Commission (EU).

References 

Women's organisations based in Ghana
Arts organizations established in 1997
1997 establishments in Ghana